Earl Scott (born September 9, 1936) is an American country music singer. He is the uncle of singer John Batdorf, who has recorded in both Batdorf & Rodney and Silver. Scott charted at No. 8 on Hot Country Songs in 1962 with "Then a Tear Fell", released via Kapp Records. He later recorded for Mercury Records and Decca Records.

Discography

References

1939 births
American country singers
Country musicians from Ohio
People from Youngstown, Ohio
Living people